

Writers and poets 
Agha Ahmad Ali (1839-1873), Bengali academic, scholar of Persian and Urdu poet
Maksim Bahdanovič,  Belarusian poet, died from tuberculosis
Manuel Bandeira, Brazilian poet, had tuberculosis in 1904 and expressed the effects of the disease in his life in many of his poems
Gustavo Adolfo Bécquer
Vissarion Belinsky, Russian literary critic
 Edward Bellamy (1850–1898), fiction writer remembered for his book Looking Backward, died from tuberculosis
Sukanta Bhattacharya, Bengali poet and playwright
 Jonas Biliūnas
 Rachel Bluwstein
 Anne and Emily Brontë and other members of the Brontë family of writers, poets and painters were struck by tuberculosis. Anne, their brother Branwell, and Emily all died of it within two years of each other. Charlotte Brontë's death in 1855 was stated at the time as having been due to tuberculosis, but there is some controversy over this today.
Clarissa Brooks, poet, died of tuberculosis in 1927
Charles Brockden Brown
Charles Farrar Browne
Elizabeth Barrett Browning, poet, died of tuberculosis in 1861
Jean de Brunhoff
Charles Bukowski (1920–1994), American author and poet, contracted tuberculosis in 1988; he recovered, losing 60 lbs. He died of leukemia.
Robert Burns
Albert Camus, French writer, playwright, activist, and absurdist philosopher, suffered from tuberculosis. He was forced to drop out of school (University of Algiers) due to severe attacks of tuberculosis. However, his death was caused by a car accident.
Gaius Valerius Catullus (ca. 84 BC – ca. 54 BC), Roman poet
Anton Chekhov (1860–1904), Russian short-story writer, playwright and physician; died from tuberculosis
Tristan Corbière
Stephen Crane
Gilles Deleuze (1925–1995)
René Daumal
Nikolay Dobrolyubov
Laura Don (1852–1886), actress-manager, playwright and artist
Paul Laurence Dunbar
Paul Éluard
Friedrich Robert Faehlmann
Maxim Gorky
Guido Gozzano (1883-1916), Italian poet
Dashiell Hammett (1894–1961), American author and creator of the "hard boiled" detective novel (notably, Sam Spade in The Maltese Falcon), contracted tuberculosis during World War I
Saima Harmaja, Finnish poet and writer
Jaroslav Hašek
Robert A. Heinlein, American author
Miguel Hernandez
Washington Irving
Takuboku Ishikawa
Panait Istrati
Helen Hunt Jackson
Alfred Jarry
Samuel Johnson
Franz Kafka (1883–1924), German-language novelist best known for his novel The Trial, died from tuberculosis
Uuno Kailas, Finnish composer
Andreas Karkavitsas, Greek writer
John Keats (1795–1821), English Romantic poet; he and his brother Tom were taken by tuberculosis
Dragotin Kette
Søren Aabye Kierkegaard (1813–1855), Danish philosopher
Charles Kingsley
Kostas Krystallis, Greek poet
Vincas Kudirka (1858–1899), Lithuanian poet and physician; died from tuberculosis
Jules Laforgue (1860–1887), French-Uruguayan poet
Sidney Lanier
D. H. Lawrence
Lu Xun
Betty MacDonald
Katherine Mansfield, New Zealand writer, died from tuberculosis aged 34
William Somerset Maugham
Guy de Maupassant
Sara Haardt Mencken
Migjeni, Albanian poet
Molière
Christian Morgenstern, German writer
Josip Murn Aleksandrov
Novalis, German author and philosopher
Jessie Fremont O'Donnell (1860–1897), writer
Eugene O'Neill
George Orwell (1903–1950), British author of Nineteen Eighty-Four, Animal Farm and Homage to Catalonia, first suffered tuberculosis in the early 30s and died from it in 1950, at the age of 46. Nineteen Eighty-Four was written during his final illness.
Walker Percy
Kristjan Jaak Peterson (1801–1822), Estonian poet, the founder of modern Estonian poetry; died from tuberculosis, lived only to age 21
Petar Petrović Njegoš Najveći srpski pisac 
Andrei Platonov
Virginia Eliza Clemm Poe (wife of Edgar Allan Poe)
Maria Polydouri, Greek poet and novelist
Alexander Pope
Eleanor Anne Porden
Katherine Anne Porter
Llewelyn Powys
Winthrop Mackworth Praed
Sholem Rabinovich
Branko Radičević
Michael Raffetto 
John Reed
Joachim Ringelnatz, German poet
Edmond Rostand
Jean-Jacques Rousseau
John Ruskin
Albert Samain
Kaarlo Sarkia (1902–1945), Finnish poet
Friedrich Schiller
Sir Walter Scott
Masaoka Shiki (1867–1902), Japanese poet famous for revitalizing the haiku, died after a long struggle with tuberculosis
Emily Shore, diarist
Anna Sissak-Bardizbanian, reporter
Juliusz Słowacki
Hristo Smirnenski
Tobias Smollett
Laurence Sterne
Robert Louis Stevenson (1850–1894), Neo-romantic Scottish essayist, novelist and poet, is thought to have suffered from tuberculosis during much of his life. He spent the winter of 1887–1888 recuperating from a presumed bout of tuberculosis at Dr. E.L. Trudeau's Adirondack Cottage Sanitarium in Saranac Lake, New York.
Alan Sillitoe
Edith Södergran (1892–1923), Finnish poet
A. H. Tammsaare (1878–1940), Estonian writer; suffered from tuberculosis after 1911
Dylan Thomas
Francis Thompson
Henry David Thoreau
Lesya Ukrainka
Katri Vala (1901-1944), Finnish poet
Chick Webb
Jessamyn West, American author, contracted tuberculosis in 1932 and recovered
Thomas Wolfe (1900–1938), American author, died of tuberculosis of the brain. His 1929 novel, Look Homeward, Angel, makes several references to the problem of consumption, though Wolfe's condition appeared rather suddenly in 1937.
Jiří Wolker
Simone Weil, French philosopher
Walt Whitman (1819–1892) Autopsy "consumption of the right lung, general miliary tuberculosis"
Vũ Trọng Phụng (1912-1939), Vietnamese author, poet.

Artists and actors
Ioannis Altamouras (1852–1878), Greek painter
Frédéric Bartholdi (1834–1904), French sculptor, creator of the Statue of Liberty
Marie Bashkirtseff (1858–1884), Russian-born, French-educated painter and diarist, died from tuberculosis at the age of 26
Aubrey Beardsley (1872–1898), English illustrator and author
Anita Berber (1899–1928) German dancer and actress
Harry Clarke (1889–1931), Irish stained glass artist and book illustrator
Colin Clive (1900–1937), British stage and screen actor
Eugène Delacroix (1798–1863), French Romantic painter
Rötger Feldmann, German comic book artist
Paul Gauguin (1848–1903), French painter
Théodore Géricault (1791–1824), French Romantic painter, died at age 32.
Boris Kustodiev (1878–1927), Russian painter and stage designer
Vivien Leigh (1913–1967), British actress
Amedeo Modigliani (1884–1920), Italian modernist painter
Tim Moore (1887–1958), American actor of stage, screen and television
Robert Natus (1890–1950), Estonian architect; suffered from tuberculosis after 1948
Kārlis Padegs (1911–1940), Latvian painter
José Pancetti (1902–1958), Brazilian modernist painter
William Ranney (1813–1857), 19th-century American painter
Slava Raškaj (1877–1906), Croatian painter
Andrei Ryabushkin (1861–1904), Russian painter
Elizabeth Siddal (1829–1862), English artists' model, poet and artist
Peter Purves Smith (1912–1949), Australian modernist artist, died during a lung operation
Virginia Frances Sterret (1900–1931), American artist and illustrator
Renée Adorée
Christiaan Van Vuuren
Edvard Munch, Norwegian painter
Mabel Normand
N!xau
Barry Morse
Dick Martin, comedian; lost a lung due to tuberculosis as a teenager
Annie Lewis (c. 1869–1896), musical comedy actress
Vivien Leigh (1913–1967), British actress of stage and screen, died from complications of tuberculosis
Georgiana Drew Barrymore, actress, succumbed aged 36

Composers, singers and musicians 
Luigi Boccherini, Italian cellist and composer, died in 1805 of pulmonary tuberculosis
Alfredo Catalani
Frédéric Chopin (1810–1849), died of consumption at age 39 (see the discussion for details). Historical records indicate episodes of hemoptysis during performances.
Stephen Foster
Hermann Goetz
Louis Joseph Ferdinand Herold
Joseph Martin Kraus
Niccolò Paganini
Jimmy Palao (1879–1925), jazz musician, died of tuberculosis at age 45
Giovanni Battista Pergolesi (1710–1736), died of tuberculosis at age 26
Henry Purcell
Johann Hermann Schein
Igor Stravinsky
Karol Szymanowski (1882-1937), died of TB at age 54
Carl Maria von Weber
Ringo Starr §, musician/former drummer of The Beatles, survived having tuberculosis at age 11

 Cat Stevens (now Yusuf Islam) §, British singer-songwriter
 Link Wray
 Jimmie Rodgers (1897–1933), country music singer, sang about the woes of tuberculosis in the song T.B. Blues (co-written with Raymond E. Hall) and ultimately died of the disease days after a New York City recording session.
 Joseph Mohr
 James "Bubber" Miley, jazz trumpeter
 Tom Jones, Welsh singing legend, spent about a year recovering from TB in his parents' basement around the age of 12
 Alex Hill, jazz pianist
 George Formby, Sr., music hall comedian and singer (d. 1921)
 Charlie Christian, jazz guitarist; pioneer of the electric guitar
 Jari Mäenpää, Finnish musician

Religious figures 
 David Brainerd (1718–1747), left a diary that reflects his reliance upon God's faithfulness amidst his battle with consumption. The diary was historically very influential, particularly to the modern Christian missionary movement.
John Calvin, leader of the Protestant Reformation
 Saint Maria Faustina Kowalska, the Roman Catholic Religious Sister and mystic from Poland, the proponent of devotion to the Divine Mercy, suffered greatly from tuberculosis and succumbed to it on 5 October 1938.
Cardinal Richelieu of France, died from tuberculosis in 1642
Saint Thérèse de Lisieux (1873–1897), died of tuberculosis
Saint Bernadette Soubirous, the visionary of Lourdes
Saint Gemma Galgani, suffered from 'tuberculosis of the spine with aggravated curvature'
Richard Wurmbrand, Protestant minister
Nachman of Breslov (1772–1810), Hasidic rabbi and religious teacher
Muktanand Swami (1758–1830), saint of the Swaminarayan Sampraday.
Jimmy Blanton, jazz bassist

Leaders and politicians 
Abdulmejid I, 31st Ottoman sultan
Simón Bolívar, the libeator of Colombia, Venezuela, Ecuador, Bolivia and Peru, died in 1830 of tuberculosis
Henry B Bolster
John C. Calhoun
Charles IX of France
Elizabeth of Austria (1436–1505), a study of her bones indicated that she probably had tuberculosis at a young age
Read Fletcher (–1889), American politician, lawyer, co-founder and editor of the Pine Bluff Graphic
Henry VII of England
Charles Hamilton Houston, NAACP lawyer known as "The Man Who Killed Jim Crow"
Andrew Jackson
Muhammed Ali Jinnah
Andres Larka (1878–1942), Estonian military commander and politician; suffered from tuberculosis after 1924
Sir Wilfrid Laurier
Louis XIII of France
Louis XVII of France
Nestor Makhno (Ukrainian revolutionary)
Peshwa Madhavrao I
James Monroe
Napoleon II of France
Pedro I of Brazil (Pedro IV of Portugal)
Petar II Petrović Njegoš (1813-1851), was a Prince-Bishop (vladika) of Montenegro, poet and philosopher whose works are widely considered some of the most important in Serbian/Montenegrin literature.
Manuel L. Quezon
John Aaron Rawlins
Dmitri Pavlovitch Romanov
Eleanor Roosevelt
Haym Salomon, major financier of the American side during the American Revolutionary War
Okita Soji (1842/1844–1868), young and famous captain of the Shinsengumi, died from tuberculosis. He was rumored to have discovered his disease when he coughed blood and fainted during the Ikedaya Affair.
Alexander Stephens
Sudirman, Commander of Indonesia's armed forces during its National Revolution
Alexis de Tocqueville (1805–1859), French political philosopher
Desmond Tutu, had tuberculosis as a child
Yasuhito, Prince Chichibu
John Young
 Edward VI of England
 Mahmud II, 30th Ottoman sultan
Nelson Mandela, South African anti-apartheid revolutionary, politician and philanthropist. He got tuberculosis exacerbated by the dank conditions in his cell
Andreas Vokos Miaoulis, Greek admiral and politician
Edward VI (1537–1553), died of tuberculosis at age 15 during his short reign as King of England
Mary Tudor, Queen of France (Daughter of Henry VII of England, third wife of Louis XII of France)
Madeleine of Valois (Daughter of Francis I of France, first wife of James V of Scotland
Ho Chi Minh
Prince Paul von Thurn und Taxis (1843–1879), former aide-de-camp of King Ludwig II
Takasugi Shinsaku (1839–1867), samurai
Gavrilo Princip
Joseph Mary Plunkett
Jane Pierce, United States first lady
Okita Soji (1844–1868), samurai
Arthur Nixon, President Nixon's brother
Harold Nixon, President Nixon's brother
Anne Neville (queen consort of Richard III) (unproven)
Asif Maharramov, national hero of Azerbaijan
Thomas "Tad" Daniel Lincoln (1853–1871), youngest child of Abraham Lincoln and Mary Todd Lincoln, died of TB in Chicago, Illinois, at age 18
John Lynch (c.1832–1866), Irish nationalist
Edward Baker Lincoln, son of Abraham Lincoln and Mary Ann Todd Lincoln
John Henry "Doc" Holliday, famous gambler and gunslinger, suffered from tuberculosis until his death in 1887
Princess Amelia, at age 27; youngest child of King George III

Scientists 

 Niels Abel, mathematician

 Anandi Gopal Joshi, first Indian woman to obtain a degree in Western medicine

Frédéric Bastiat
Alexander Graham Bell
Anders Celsius
William Kingdon Clifford, mathematician and philosopher
Reuben Crandall, 19th-century physician, caught disease while in jail awaiting trial; he was acquitted
Gotthold Eisenstein, mathematician
Augustin-Jean Fresnel
Richard Brinsley Hinds (1811–1846), British naval surgeon, botanist and malacologist, diagnosed with phthisis in 1845 
George Katona, founder of behavioural macro-economics
Immanuel Kant
Dmitri Mendeleev, creator of the first version of the periodic table of elements.
Friedrich Miescher, Swiss biochemist, noted for discovery of nucleic acids in cell nucleus (1844–1895)
Srinivasa Ramanujan, mathematician; uncertain: believed for many years to have died from tuberculosis but now suspected the cause may have been hepatic amoebiasis
Gustav Roch, mathematician
Bernhard Riemann, mathematician
Erwin Schrödinger
Baruch Spinoza
Eugene Wigner
Félix Vicq-d'Azyr, French anatomist
Lev Vygotsky
Adrianus Turnebus
Edward Livingston Trudeau, American physician who established the Adirondack Cottage Sanitorium for treatment of tuberculosis
Herman Potočnik
René Laennec, French physician; inventor of the stethoscope
Wang Jin, former President of the Hubei Archaeological Association, died of Thoracic Spinal Tuberculosis at age 93

Businessmen 

 Jay Gould, American railroad magnate and financier of the Gilded Age (1880s)
 William Winchester (son of Oliver Winchester, husband of Sarah Winchester)

Sportsmen 

 Malcolm Allison, footballer and manager 
 James Burke
 Rico Carty, baseball player
 George Coulthard, Australian cricketer and Australian rules footballer
 Archie Jackson, Australian cricketer
 Dan Kolov, Bulgarian wrestler
 George Lohmann, English cricketer
 Christy Mathewson (1880–1925), major league baseball pitcher; developed tuberculosis as a consequence of being accidentally gassed during a training exercise while serving in the U.S. Army Chemical Service during World War I. Zee
 Red Schoendienst, baseball player and manager
 Georges Vezina
 Rube Waddell

Fictional characters 

 Arthur Morgan, fictional former gunslinger and member of the Van Der Linde gang (1863-1899); Main protagonist in Rockstar game Red Dead Redemption 2
 Helen Burns in Jane Eyre
 Marguerite Gautier in La Dame aux Camélias
 Nikolai Dmitrich Levin in Anna Karenina
 Mimì in La Bohème
 The patients of Thomas Mann's sanatorium of The Magic Mountain

Others 
Simonetta Vespucci
Beulah Annan
Samuel Arnold
Sarah Bernhardt
Louis Braille
Cheng Man-ch'ing, T'ai chi ch'uan master 
W. C. Fields
Brenda Fricker
Andrés Gómez
Emmett Hardy
Antonia Navarro Huezo, at age 21; first woman in Central America to graduate from university
John Ives
Adrian Joss
Freddie Keppard
Lin Huiyin (1904–1955), Chinese architect
Leander H. McNelly
Ismail Mohammed
Florence Nightingale
Etti Plesch
Shanawdithit, believed to have been the last surviving member of the Beothuk people of Newfoundland, died from tuberculosis in 1829.
Tulasa Thapa, kidnapped Nepali girl, died of tuberculosis in 1995

References

Further reading
 Rothman, Sheila M. (1994). Living in the Shadow of Death: Tuberculosis and the Social Experience of Illness in American History. 

 
Lists of people by cause of death